The men's singles event at the 2022 Mediterranean Games will be held from 27 June to 1 July at the Habib Khelil Tennis Complex.

Francesco Passaro of Italy won the gold medal, defeating Carlos López Montagud of Spain in the final, 6–7, 6–4, 6–3.

Adam Moundir of Morocco won the bronze medal, defeating Elliot Benchetrit of Morocco in the bronze medal match, Walkover.

Medalists

Seeds
The top four seeds received a bye into the second round.

Draw

Finals

Top half

Bottom half

References

External links
 Draw

Men's singles